Aidi is a dog breed.

Aidi or AIDI may also refer to:
Aidi (footballer), Chinese football player

See also
Ai Di (disambiguation), Chinese emperors

 Aidy